Jovanovac may refer to:

 Jovanovac (Merošina), a village in Serbia
 Jovanovac (Aerodrom), a village in Serbia
 Jovanovac, Croatia, a 19th and 20th century name a village near Antunovac, Osijek-Baranja County no known as Ivanovac